AlphaTauri is a fashion brand founded in 2016 as a brand extension of Red Bull into the fashion industry. The brand is named after the Alpha Tauri star, and pays tribute to the founding company, Red Bull. Its headquarters are in Salzburg, Austria.

Background 
AlphaTauri launched its first campaign for the Autumn/Winter 2018 season. The collection in 2018 included parkas, coats, shirts, sweaters, T-shirts, caps, belts and bags. In 2019, a pop-up store was presented, which is built into a truck and can be set up within 20 minutes and is around 60 square meters in size. Its first mission was planned for autumn 2020.

In 2020, AlphaTauri launched a capsule collection of heatable clothes developed with Schoeller Textil and Telekom.

Since its launch, the brand has participated in various international fashion fairs such as FashionTech as well as the bi-annual Berlin Fashion Week, where the brand showcased its use of 3D technology in clothing design, through 3D Knit lab from Japanese company Shima Seiki.

Activities 
Alpha Tauri develops and patents its own textile technologies, such as Taurex, developed in collaboration with the Swiss company Schoeller Textil AG specializing in the development and production of innovative fabrics and textile technologies.

The brand had three flagship stores in 2022, one in Graz, one in Vienna and one in Salzburg.

Motorsport

The Scuderia Toro Rosso Formula One team was rebranded to Scuderia AlphaTauri from the 2020 Formula One season. Pierre Gasly won the 2020 Italian Grand Prix while driving for the team.

AlphaTauri signed a two-year deal with Formula One to become the official premium fashion apparel supplier, starting from the 2022 season.

References

External links 

 

Red Bull
Clothing brands
Luxury brands
High fashion brands
Clothing manufacturers